Turato is a surname. Notable people with the surname include:
Gessica Turato (born 1984), Italian road cyclist
Nora Turato (born 1991), Croatian graphic designer